Gini Cruz Santos is a Filipina animator at Pixar studios based in the San Francisco Bay Area. She worked on numerous Pixar animation films including Toy Story 2, Monsters, Inc., Finding Nemo, A Bug's Life, The Incredibles, Ratatouille, Toy Story 3, Up, Lifted and Brave. She was nominated in 2004 for an Annie award for her detailed lifelike animation on Finding Nemo, and was nominated by the Visual Effects Society for an award for this project as well.

Santos was born in Pasay in the Philippines. She moved to Guam after age three but returned to study in the Philippines. She studied Fine Arts at the University of Santo Tomas with a major in advertising. She earned a Master of Fine Arts degree in Computer Arts from the School of Visual Arts in New York City.

Santos worked as an art director at an advertising agency. In 1996, she was hired by Pixar after submitting her short feature reel entitled The Eclipse without submitting her resume; her reel focused on human relationships. Her animation of Dory, voiced by Ellen DeGeneres, on the film Finding Nemo was praised for integrating "fish movement, human movement, and facial expressions to make them look and feel like real characters". She was the supervising animator on the Pixar short film entitled Lifted. She was lauded for her work in Brave. She is sometimes described as a Pixnoy: a Filipino-American or Fil-am artist working at Pixar.

References

External links

Filipino animators
University of Santo Tomas alumni
Pixar people
Living people
People from Pasay
Artists from Metro Manila
Filipino women animators
1966 births